Love Wind Love Song is a 1999 South Korean romance film about a Seoul businessman (Jang Dong-gun) who comes to Jeju Island and meets a lonely tour guide (Ko So-young).

Cast
 Jang Dong-gun as Tae-hee
 Ko So-young as Young-seo
 Park Jin-hee as Young-seo's friend
 Han Na-na as Employee Han
 Son Young-soon as a lost grandmother
 Lee Hyun  as an English teacher
 Han Jae-suk as a movie star (cameo)

Trivia
Lead actors Jang and Ko married in 2010.

References

External links
 
 

1999 films
1999 romantic drama films
South Korean romantic drama films
Films set in Jeju
Films shot in Jeju
1990s Korean-language films